Bohai Town, is a town located on southwestern Huairou District, Beijing, China. Situated inside a valley, It borders Sihai Town to its north, Yanqi and Huairou Towns to its east, Qiaozi Town to its south, and Jiuduhe Town to its southwest. In 2020, the census counted12,702 residents for this town . 

The town was officially created in 1998. Its name came from the early settlers who were from Balhae during the Tang dynasty.

Administrative divisions 
As of 2021, Bohai Town was divided into 21 villages:

Landmark 

 Mutianyu

See also 

 List of township-level divisions of Beijing

References 

Huairou District
Towns in Beijing